Edward Pickett may refer to:

 Ted Pickett (1909–2009), Australian sportsman
 Edward Bradford Pickett (1823–1882), attorney, Confederate soldier and Texas politician